Hubert Redwood (13 June 1913 – 28 October 1943) was an English professional footballer who played in the Football League for Manchester United as a right-back.

Personal life
Redwood served as a corporal in the South Lancashire Regiment during the Second World War and died of tuberculosis on 28 October 1943. He was buried in St Helens Cemetery.

Career statistics

Honours
Manchester United
Football League Second Division second-place promotion: 1937–38

References

External links
Profile at MUFCInfo.com

1913 births
1943 deaths
20th-century deaths from tuberculosis
Association football fullbacks
British Army  personnel killed in World War II
English Football League players
English footballers
Footballers from St Helens, Merseyside
Manchester United F.C. players
South Lancashire Regiment soldiers
Tuberculosis deaths in England
Military personnel from Merseyside